Renminlu is a metro station of Zhengzhou Metro Line 1.

The station lies beneath Renmin Road, between Duling Street and Xili Street.

Station layout 
The station has 3 floors underground. The B1 floor is the station concourse and the B2 floor is for equipments. The B3 floor is for platforms and tracks. The station has one island platform and two tracks for Line 1.

Exits

Surroundings
Dennis Department Store (Renmin Store) (丹尼斯百货人民店)
The 1st Affiliated Hospital of HUTCM (河南中医药大学第一附属医院)
Zhongyuan Book Building (中原图书大厦)
Xinhua Jianguo Hotel (新华建国饭店)
Grand Shanghai City Mall (大上海城)
Shangcheng Park (商城公园)

References

Stations of Zhengzhou Metro
Line 1, Zhengzhou Metro
Railway stations in China opened in 2013